Berriozábal is a city and one of the 122 Municipalities of Chiapas, in southern Mexico. It covers an area of 300.6 km².

In 2010, the municipality had a total population of 43,179, up from 28,719 in 2005.

In 2010, the city of Berriozábal had a population of 28,128. Other than the city of Berriozábal, the municipality had 485 localities, the largest of which (with 2010 populations in parentheses) were: Santa Inés Buenavista (1,559), Ignacio Zaragoza (1,354), and Las Maravillas (1,339), classified as rural.

References

Municipalities of Chiapas